Uncial 099 (in the Gregory-Aland numbering), ε 47 (Soden); is a Greek uncial manuscript of the New Testament, assigned paleographically to the 7th-century.

Description 

The codex contains a small part of the Gospel of Mark 16:6-8; shorter ending; 16:9-18, on one thick parchment leaf (32 by 26 cm). The text is written in two columns per page, 32 lines per page, in large uncial letters.

It has two endings to the Gospel of Mark (as in codices Ψ 0112 274mg 579 Lectionary 1602).

The Greek text of this codex is mixed. Kurt Aland placed it in Category III.

In Mark 16:14 it reads εγηγερμενον along with C3 D K L W Θ Π Ψ 099 700 1010 2174 Byz Lect.

Currently it is dated by the INTF to the 7th-century.

The codex is located now at the Bibliothèque nationale de France (Copt. 129,8), in Paris.

See also 

 List of New Testament uncials
 Textual criticism

References

Further reading 

 E. Amélineau, "Notice des manuscrits coptes de la Bibliothèque nationale renfermant des textes bilingues du Nouveau Testament. Notices et extraits des manuscrits de la Bibliothèque nationale et autres bibliothèques", tome XXXIV, 2e partie NEMBM 34/2 (Paris: 1895), pp. 402–404.
 C. R. Gregory, Textkritik des Neuen Testamentes III (Leipzig: 1909), pp. 70–71.

Greek New Testament uncials
7th-century biblical manuscripts
Bibliothèque nationale de France collections